The Source Presents: Hip Hop Hits, Volume 5 is the fifth annual music compilation album to be contributed by The Source magazine. Released December 18, 2001, and distributed by Def Jam Recordings, Hip Hop Hits Volume 5 features sixteen hip hop and rap hits (two of them are bonus tracks). It went to number 37 on the Top R&B/Hip Hop Albums chart and peaked at number 48 on the Billboard 200 album chart.

Purple Pills (or Purple Hills) is the only number-one Hot Rap Tracks hit on Volume 5. Likewise, the album is the second in Hip Hop Hits series to feature a Billboard Hot 100 number one hit (Volume 1 is first): I'm Real. It is the fourth Hip Hop Hits album not to feature a number-one hit on the R&B/Hip Hop chart.

Track listing
We Right Here – DMX
I'm A Thug – Trick Daddy
I'm Real – Ja Rule and Jennifer Lopez
Let Me Blow Ya Mind – Eve and Gwen Stefani
Area Codes – Ludacris and Nate Dogg
Bad Boy For Life – P. Diddy, Black Rob and Mark Curry
Ride Wit Me – Nelly and City Spud
Purple Pills – D12
Bang Ta Dis – Benzino
Oh Yeah – Foxy Brown and Spragga Benz
Front 2 Back – Xzibit
Get Ur Freak On – Missy Elliott
Project Bitch – Cash Money Millionaires, Big Tymers, Lil Wayne and Juvenile
Put Ya Hands Up – Jadakiss
Get Fucked Up (The Iconz) – The Iconz (producers)
So Fresh, So Clean – Outkast, Snoop Dogg and Sleepy Brown

Alternate titles
The edited version of the compilation featured substitute clean titles: Purple Hills, Project Chick and Get Crunked Up.

References

Hip hop compilation albums
2001 compilation albums
Def Jam Recordings compilation albums